Andrew Wyhowanec Logan (February 17, 1918 – November 21, 1998) was an American football player. 

A native of Ohio, Logan attended high school in Connorville.  He next attend the Western Reserve University and played college football as a tackle for the Western Reserve Red Cats football team.

He also played professional football in the National Football League (NFL) for the Detroit Lions. Playing at the tackle and center positions, he appeared in nine NFL games during the 1941 season.

References

1918 births
1998 deaths
American football tackles
American football centers
Detroit Lions players
Players of American football from Ohio